Bodonida is an order of kinetoplastid flagellate excavates. It contains the genera Bodo and Rhynchomonas, relatives to the parasitic trypanosomes. This order also contains the colonial genus Cephalothamnium.

Taxonomy
Bodonida contains the following suborders and families:
 Eubodonina 
 Neobodonina 
 Bodonidae Bütschli, 1887
 Neobodonidae 
 Rhynchomonadidae 
 Parabodonina 
 Cryptobiidae Vickerman
 Parabodonidae Cavalier-Smith

References

Kinetoplastids
Excavata orders